Synova is a growth focused investor supporting European companies valued between £20m and £250m. The firm manages £1.7bn of capital on behalf of institutional investors and family offices and invests across four sectors: Software & Data, Tech Enabled Services, Financial Services and Health & Education. Synova partners with founders and managers to accelerate growth and drive exceptional returns. Synova is currently investing across the full mid-market spectrum from its £875m fifth fund, raised in 2022, which includes a dedicated £250m pool of capital, Chrysalis, to support smaller growth companies.

The firm was named UK House of the Year at the 2022 and 2020 Private Equity Awards and House of the Year at the 2022 and 2019 British Private Equity Awards, the fourth time in seven years Synova has won this prestigious accolade. According to Preqin Synova's returns currently place the firm as the UK's top performing private equity fund.

Synova was founded in 2007 by its managing partners, David Menton and Philip Shapiro. Synova's other partners include Tim Ashlin, Alex Bowden, Daniel Silverton-Parker and Zachary Tsai.

Synova's 2007 Fund I was fully realised in 2018 generating a 4x return for investors. Synova's £110m 2013 Fund II has now returned three times its total invested capital following exits in 2018 and 2019 with only half the fund realised. Synova closed its 2016 third fund at £250m which is performing strongly with three times its total invested capital returned with only a third of the fund realised. Synova closed its 2019 fourth fund at its £365m hard cap.

Notable exits include the sale of Kinapse to Hg Capital generating a 16x return, the sale of Tonic Games to Epic Games for a 9x return and 200% IRR, the sale of Mandata for a 8x return and the sale of Mintec to Five Arrows Principal Investments for a 12x return. Synova’s average return on realised investments is 6.2x invested capital.

Current and past* investments

References

Private equity firms of the United Kingdom
British companies established in 2007